Hardtner is a city in Barber County, Kansas, United States.  As of the 2020 census, the population of the city was 167.  It is located 1 mile north of the Kansas / Oklahoma state border.

History
Hardtner was founded in 1887. It was named for Dr. John Hardtner, a landowner.

The first post office in Hardtner was established in July 1887.

By 1908 the townspeople had realized that they would need a railroad line to the outside world in order to survive. The town's founder Jacob Achenbach, helped set up a company to build a line east to Kiowa. The line would have to cross the Santa Fe's tracks to link with the Missouri Pacific, the planned connection for Hardtner's line. The Santa Fe's Superintendent was not about to stand for that, so he had his private car block the spot where the lines would cross. A local got word to him that the Hardtner people had about 45 cowboys ready to "riddle his car with bullets" The Superintendent moved his car, and the line was completed.

On June 2, 1929, a tornado struck Hardtner, causing minor damage. The tornado was notable since it moved very slowly, yielding some of the highest quality photographs of a tornado to that date.

Hardtner is also known for its yearly Independence Day celebrations. This event attracts people from all around the Kansas/Oklahoma state-line area. Yearly events include a themed parade, medallion hunt, pit beef sandwiches, and a fireworks show.

Geography
Hardtner is located at  (37.013263, -98.648775).

Climate
The climate in this area is characterized by hot, humid summers and generally mild to cool winters.  According to the Köppen Climate Classification system, Hardtner has a humid subtropical climate, abbreviated "Cfa" on climate maps.

Demographics

2010 census
As of the census of 2010, there were 172 people, 85 households, and 44 families residing in the city. The racial makeup of the city was 95.9% White, 0.6% Native American, 0.6% Asian, and 2.9% from two or more races. Hispanic or Latino of any race were 1.7% of the population.

There were 85 households, of which 17.6% had children under the age of 18 living with them, 45.9% were married couples living together, 3.5% had a female householder with no husband present, 2.4% had a male householder with no wife present, and 48.2% were non-families. 43.5% of all households were made up of individuals, and 24.7% had someone living alone who was 65 years of age or older. The average household size was 2.02 and the average family size was 2.84.

The median age in the city was 51 years. 19.2% of residents were under the age of 18; 1.1% were between the ages of 18 and 24; 19.2% were from 25 to 44; 36.7% were from 45 to 64; and 23.8% were 65 years of age or older. The gender makeup of the city was 52.3% male and 47.7% female.

2000 census
As of the census of 2000, there were 199 people, 95 households, and 64 families residing in the city. The racial makeup of the city was 98.49% White, 1.01% Native American, and 0.50% from two or more races.

There were 95 households, out of which 18.9% had children under the age of 18 living with them, 63.2% were married couples living together, 2.1% had a female householder with no husband present, and 31.6% were non-families. 30.5% of all households were made up of individuals, and 21.1% had someone living alone who was 65 years of age or older. The average household size was 2.09 and the average family size was 2.55.

In the city, the population was spread out, with 18.1% under the age of 18, 4.5% from 18 to 24, 16.1% from 25 to 44, 29.6% from 45 to 64, and 31.7% who were 65 years of age or older. The median age was 54 years. For every 100 females, there were 105.2 males. For every 100 females age 18 and over, there were 98.8 males.

The median income for a household in the city was $31,875, and the median income for a family was $34,038. Males had a median income of $27,083 versus $19,583 for females. The per capita income for the city was $18,390. About 7.8% of families and 7.5% of the population were below the poverty line, including 15.6% of those under the age of eighteen and none of those 65 or over.

Education
Hardtner is served by South Barber USD 255 public school district.

Hardtner High School was closed through school unification. The Hardtner High School mascot was Tornadoes.

Gallery

References

Further reading

External links

 Hardtner - Directory of Public Officials
 USD 255, local school district
 Hardtner, Barber County, Kansas Barber County, Kansas: History and Genealogy
 Twister Wrecks Buildings at Hardtner "The Hardtner Press", April 21, 1927.
 Hardtner city map, KDOT
 Hardtner Plot Map, Barber County, Kansas From "Standard Atlas of Barber County, Kansas", 1905.

Cities in Kansas
Cities in Barber County, Kansas